Charlotte Kemp may refer to:

 Charlotte Kemp (model) (born 1961), American model and actress
 Charlotte Kemp (missionary) (1790–1860), missionary for the Church of England in New Zealand